A list of Western films released in the 1980s.

See also
 List of TV Westerns

References

 
1980
Western